The 2008–09 was the first season for Perth Glory in the new W-League.

Background
Nicola Williams was appointed the coach of the team, with Tanya Oxtoby captaining.

Match results

Legend

W-League

Player details

Statistics accurate as of the end of the 2008–09 W-League season

Coach: Nicola Williams
Captain: Tanya Oxtoby

Standings

Awards
Goal of the Year: Marianna Tabain, Perth Glory – Round 9, Adelaide United v Perth Glory

References

Perth Glory FC (A-League Women) seasons
Perth Glory W-League

Perth Glory